Illinois Valley Regional Airport , also known as Walter A. Duncan Field, is a city-owned, public-use airport located  northwest of the central business district of Peru, a city in LaSalle County, Illinois, United States. The airport was opened in November 1985. The airport hosts the TBM Avenger Reunion every year in May.

Facilities and aircraft 
It has two runways, one designated 18/36 with an asphalt surface measuring 5,999 by 100 feet (1,829 x 30 m) and a second designated 7/25 with an asphalt surface measuring 3,999 by 75 feet.

A number of construction projects began at the airport in 2022 to upgrade facilities. The airport plans on extending the airport's major taxiway as well as adding five new hangars.

The airport has an FBO that offers services such as catering, ground and cargo handling, and ground power units for transient aircraft as well as hangars for long-term storage. The facility offers charter flights. Meeting rooms, a lounge, a weather briefing station, and courtesy cars are also available.

The airport also has a flying club that offers aircraft rental, flight training, and events such as fly-in breakfasts.

For the 12-month period ending December 31, 2007, the airport had 21,000 aircraft operations, an average of 57 per day: 98% general aviation, 1% air taxi and 1% military. At that time, there were 33 aircraft based at this airport: 85% single-engine, 12% multi-engine and 3% helicopter.

See also
 List of airports in Illinois

References

External links 
 
 Traveling in the Illinois Valley at the Illinois Valley Area Chamber of Commerce and Economic Development website
 

Airports in Illinois
Transportation buildings and structures in LaSalle County, Illinois